Chen Hongmou (October 10, 1696 – July 14, 1771), courtesy name Ruzi and Rongmen, was a Chinese official, scholar, and philosopher, who is widely regarded as a model official of the Qing dynasty.

Early life

Chen was born in Lingui, Guangxi, to a family who migrated from Chenzhou in Hunan province in the late Ming dynasty. He was noted for the longest total service and most provincial posts than any other official during the Qing dynasty. In their work Anthology of Qing Statecraft Writings, He Changling and Wei Yuan praised him as an exemplary official, being surpassed only by Gu Yanwu.

Career

Chen considered himself a disciple of Zhu Xi, but condemned various types of intellectual partisanship. His essays were very progressive for his time – in his vigorous advocation of education for people everywhere, he was one of the first philosophers to clearly state the idea that women and non-Chinese tribes could, and should, receive the same education as Han Chinese men.

Together with Gu Yanwu, He Changling, and Wei Yuan (mentioned above) he belongs to the "statecraft school" of the Chinese thought: its proponents advocated accommodation of the local administration to the changing social realities.

Further reading

1696 births
1771 deaths
18th-century Chinese philosophers
Chinese Confucianists
People from Guilin
Philosophers from Guangxi
Qing dynasty politicians from Guangxi
Grand Secretaries of the Qing dynasty
Assistant Grand Secretaries
Viceroys of Huguang
Viceroys of Liangguang